Kirstine Stewart (born c. 1968) is a media executive and author who is currently the Head of Shaping the Future of Media at the World Economic Forum. She was formerly the head of English language services at the Canadian Broadcasting Corporation, vice-president of media at Twitter, and chief revenue officer of Tribalscale.

Stewart was born in Canada to British emigrants who came to Canada in the 1960s. She is the eldest of their two daughters. She attended Milton District High School, where she was named an Ontario Scholar at age sixteen. Stewart earned a Bachelor of Arts from the University of Toronto in 1988, majoring in English with a minor in business. Stewart is married to Zaib Shaikh, the former star of Little Mosque and the current consul general of Canada in Los Angeles.

Career
Stewart first became prominent as head of programming for Alliance Atlantis cable channels, including HGTV, Food Network, National Geographic and BBC Canada. Before that, she worked in the United States where she headed up international television broadcasting for Hallmark Channels worldwide.

She then joined the Canadian Broadcasting Corporation in 2006 as executive director of programming for CBC Television.  Known as Kirstine Layfield at the time, she later returned to using her birth surname, Stewart. Her tenure with CBC Television was noted for popular series such as Little Mosque on the Prairie, Dragons' Den, The Tudors, Battle of the Blades, Murdoch Mysteries and Being Erica, which revived the network's primetime ratings after a number of years of decline.

On April 29, 2013, Stewart resigned from her position with the CBC after accepting a position at Twitter. She led Twitter's expansion into Canada, and moved to New York where she successfully oversaw North American partnerships across all verticals.

On September 20, 2016, Stewart left her position at Twitter to join the content publisher Diply as their chief strategy officer. Under her stewardship, Diply was named an EY Young Entrepreneur of the Year, won NextMedia's Digi Awards Company of the Year, and ranked first in Deloitte's Fast50 Tech Growth Companies in Canada.

On January 30, 2018, it was announced that Stewart had joined TribalScale, a global innovation firm headquartered in Toronto. She presided over the launch of TribalScale Venture Studios.

Stewart's book Our Turn, published by Random House in 2015, is a national best-seller about leadership.

She also formerly sat on the board of Kognitiv, theScore, and WOW Entertainment. Stewart was also a member of the DMZ Advisory Council, and a mentor for theBIGPush.

References

Canadian television executives
Women television executives
Living people
Canadian Broadcasting Corporation people
Twitter, Inc. people
University of Toronto alumni
Businesspeople from Toronto
Canadian women business executives
Year of birth missing (living people)